Dan Druff may refer to:

Dan Druff (musician), born Daniel James Irving, rock musician
Todd Witteles, professional poker player known as Dan Druff

See also
Dandruff, excessive shedding of dead skin cells from the scalp